Tyler's tree frog or the southern laughing tree frog (Litoria tyleri) is an arboreal species of tree frog. It is native to eastern Australia where it occurs from south-eastern Queensland to the southern coast of New South Wales.  It is generally a coastal species and is not found inland.

Etymology
The specific name tyleri honours Michael J. Tyler, an Australian herpetologist.

Description 

This frog is grey-brown to fawn (of various shades) on its dorsal surface, and a whitish-yellow on its ventral surface. Females are larger than males and reach a maximum size of about 50 mm. It has green flecks on the back.  The iris is golden in colour and it has cross-shaped pupils. This species is very similar to the Peron's tree frog, (Litoria peronii).  The easiest way to tell them apart is by call, but L. peronii has strong black and yellow marbling in the thighs, armpits, hands and feet.  L. tyleri has only faint yellow and brown marbling in the legs and armpits, lacking marbling in the hands and feet.  This species lacks a strong black line above the tympanum, this line is present in L. peronii.  As it is an arboreal frog, the toe pads are larger than its toes and fingers, allowing it to grip well on branches.  Its hands are partially webbed, its toes are  completely webbed, and the tympanum is visible. During breeding, males can turn a very strong yellow colour.

Ecology and behaviour 
This species inhabits coastal forest and cleared land.  It is normally found around permanent dams, swamps, and ponds.  Males call from vegetation around the water body during spring and summer, often after rain.  The call of this species resembles a short laughing noise, similar to that of the Peron's tree frog, but without a downward inflection.

As a pet 
It is kept as a pet; in Australia, this animal may be kept in captivity with the appropriate permit.

References

 Frogs of Australia - Litoria tyleri
 Frogs Australia Network - Litoria tyleri-frog call available here.
Article Road: List of All Frog Breeds: Things You Can Do to Ensure Your Frog Has a Long, Happy and Healthy Life: Tyler's Tree Frog
Department of Environment and Heritage: Frog Keeper's License
Department of Environment, Climate Change and Water, New South Wales: Amphibian Keeper's Licence: Species Lists

External links

Litoria
Amphibians of Queensland
Amphibians of New South Wales
Amphibians described in 1979
Frogs of Australia